"Strangers" (stylised as "sTraNgeRs") is a song by British rock band Bring Me the Horizon. Produced by Zakk Cervini, BloodPop and Evil Twin, it was released as the second single from the group's upcoming second Post Human release, following 2020's Post Human: Survival Horror, on 6 July 2022.

Promotion and release
On 27 May 2022, the band unveiled an edited version of "Strangers" for the first time during a DJ set at their Malta Weekender Festival. The band were originally meant to release the single prior to the festival but were unable to due to not being able to shoot a music video in time. On 22 June, they formally announced the official release date of "Strangers" for 6 July 2022. On the day of the song's release, "Strangers" was premiered on BBC Radio 1 during Clara Amfo's "Future Sounds" segment as the "Hottest Record" ahead of the music video being released an hour later.

Composition and lyrics
"Strangers" has been described by critics as pop-punk, alternative rock, pop rock, hard rock, and an emo song. The song was written by the band's lead vocalist Oliver Sykes, keyboardist Jordan Fish, guitarist Lee Malia, Caroline Ailin and BloodPop, while it was produced by Zakk Cervini, BloodPop and Evil Twin. The song touches on the different kinds of trauma in its lyrical content and how Sykes wanted to use that to bring people with mental health problems together. Sykes explained his thought process on how the song came together: 

In an interview with Maniacs, Fish expressed his feelings about what "Strangers" meant to him and the band in terms of the importance of their musical progression:

Music video
The official music video for "Strangers" was premiered on YouTube one hour after the single was released on 6 July 2022. The video was directed by Thomas James, marking this the first time Sykes hasn't had music video directorial duties since "Mother Tongue". 

The band asked fans to anonymously share their own personal struggles and stories that the band used to inspire the disturbing narrative and visuals that transpire in the music video. The music video for "Strangers" features disturbing visuals of people being overtaken by alien-like viruses in desolated warehouses, suffering in pain while their faces are being horrifically mutated into contorted figures. The band perform the song simultaneously as the video alternates between the various scenes. Revolver compared the video to the likes of a Saw film crossed with Alien. The video was also noted of taking inspiration from the classic dark rock videos of the 1990s.

Personnel
Credits adapted from Tidal.

Bring Me the Horizon
 Oliver Sykes – lead vocals, composition, lyrics
 Lee Malia – guitars, composition, lyrics
 Jordan Fish – keyboards, programming, percussion, backing vocals, engineering, composition, lyrics
 Matt Kean – bass
 Matt Nicholls – drums

Additional personnel
 Zakk Cervini – production, mixing
 BloodPop – production, composition, lyrics
 Evil Twin – production
 Ted Jensen – mastering
 Caroline Ailin – composition, lyrics
 Nik Trekov – production assistant
 Choir Noir – choir

Charts

Weekly charts

Year-end charts

References

 Bring Me the Horizon songs
2022 songs
2022 singles
Songs written by Oliver Sykes
Songs written by Caroline Ailin
Songs written by BloodPop
RCA Records singles
Sony Music singles
British pop punk songs
British pop rock songs
British alternative rock songs
Emo songs